Maida Vale: The BBC Radio One Sessions is a compilation album by Van der Graaf Generator, containing eight songs from four different recording sessions at Maida Vale Studios for BBC Radio 1 in 1971, 1975 and 1976, three of which were Peel Sessions. It was released in June 1994 on Band of Joy Records.

All tracks were re-released on the 2015 2CD BBC compilation After the Flood: At the BBC 1968-1977, together with all the other BBC sessions, which survived in good audio quality.

The versions of "When She Comes" and "Masks" found here were also released as bonus tracks on the 2005 Charisma reissue of World Record.

Track listing 
All songs written by Peter Hammill, except where noted.

 "Darkness" - 7:17 (Sounds of the Seventies, 10 June 1971)
 "Man-Erg" - 11:00 (same)
 "Scorched Earth" - 9:40 (John Peel Show, 3 July 1975) (Hammill, David Jackson)
 "Sleepwalkers" - 8:58 (same)
 "Still Life" - 7:20 (John Peel Show, 1 April 1976)
 "La Rossa" - 10:00 (same)
 "When She Comes" - 8:08 (John Peel Show, 11 Nov 1976)
 "Masks" - 7:22 (same)

Personnel 
Van der Graaf Generator 
 Peter Hammill – vocals, piano, guitar and moods
 Hugh Banton – organ, bass pedals and design
 Guy Evans – drums and tiptoe
 David Jackson – saxophones, flute and his own devices

References

External links 
 Van der Graaf Generator Maida Vale: The BBC Radio One Sessions (1994) album review by Greg Prato, credits & releases at AllMusic.com
 Van der Graaf Generator Maida Vale: The BBC Radio One Sessions (1994) album releases & credits at Discogs.com

Van der Graaf Generator albums
1994 live albums
Live progressive rock albums